Aminadav is a moshav in Israel. It may also refer to:

Aminadav (non-profit organization) in Israel
Nachshon ben Aminadav, a midrashic biblical figure